GuilFest, formerly the Guildford Festival of Folk and Blues, was a music festival held in Stoke Park, Guildford, England, each July.  The festival, like the larger Glastonbury Festival, featured a range of genres including rock, folk, blues, and in recent years pop. In 2006 GuilFest was awarded the title of "Best Family Festival" in the UK Festival awards.

GuilFests 1992–2012

The event was started in 1992 by Tony Scott a Guildford businessman who is a keen festival-goer, the festival grew from an audience size of 500 with two stages in 1992 to 20,000 with 10 stages by 2011. As well as music, the festival also included comedy, theatre and performing arts. From 1992 to 1994 it was a one-day event. In 1995 it became a two-day event with onsite camping and was moved to nearby Loseley Park. GuilFest returned to Stoke Park in 1996 and became a three-day festival in 1997 with headliners Jethro Tull.

1998 acts included Space, Shed Seven and The Lightning Seeds, The Levellers.

1999 acts included James, The Saw Doctors and Jools Holland & His Rhythm and Blues Orchestra.

2000 was Van Morrison, Joan Armatrading, David Gray, Culture Club, Motörhead and Rolf Harris.

2001 included Pulp, James, Reef, Dreadzone, Lonnie Donegan and Dead Men Walking.

2002 acts included Jools Holland, Fun Lovin' Criminals and The Pretenders .

In 2003, the main acts were Madness, Alice Cooper, The Darkness and Atomic Kitten.

In 2004 the main acts were Katie Melua, Simple Minds, Blondie and UB40.
 
The 2005 event, at that point the biggest in the event's history with 15,000 people attending, featured 6 music stages along with a comedy tent. The headline acts were The Pogues, Paul Weller, and Status Quo, other acts included The Storys, Chas and Dave and the Subways.

The 2006 event was headlined by Embrace, a-ha and Billy Idol, and featured Nizlopi, The Wonder Stuff, The Lightning Seeds, The Stranglers, Gary Numan and The Storys. GuilFest won the Best Family Festival Award for 2006.

The 2007 event was held again at Stoke Park on the 13th, 14th, and 15 July 2007 and the BBC Radio 2 main stage was headlined by Supergrass, Squeeze and Madness. The Magic Numbers played before Madness on the Sunday. The second stage (sponsored by Ents24) featured Richard Thompson, The Saw Doctors, and Uriah Heep as the headliners.

The 2008 event was sponsored by the University of Surrey and headlined by The Levellers, Blondie and The Australian Pink Floyd Show. Fightstar, The Ghost of a Thousand and The Blackout played the Rock Sound sponsored Rock Cave in 2008 as well.

2009 performers included: Motörhead, Goldie Lookin Chain, You Me at Six, Nouvelle Vague, Brian Wilson (Beach Boys), Joe Bonamassa, Happy Mondays, The Wailers, The Charlatans, Athlete, Toploader, Will Young, Eureka Machines, DJ Yoda, Rusko, The Love Band, The Fins and Andrew Morris (Singer Songwriter).

2010's line-up included Status Quo, N-Dubz, Hawkwind, 10cc, The Blockheads, Orbital, The Human League, Just Jack, Tinie Tempah, Chase & Status, The Blackout, Rock Choir and Hadouken!,

2011's line-up included Roger Daltry, Razorlight, James Blunt, Adam Ant, The Farm, Peter Andre, Ziggy Marley, Erasure.

2012's line-up included Olly Murs, Bryan Ferry, Gary Numan, Ash, Alvin Startdust, Slider

2014's line-up included The Boomtown Rats, Kool & The Gang, The Human League, Fun Lovin' Criminals, Boney M., Ms Dynamite, The Blackout.

Insolvency
After 21 years, Guilfest shut down. Scotty Events Ltd, the company that ran the festival, said matters were in the hands of an insolvency practitioner. Tony Scott, from Scotty Events, said the company had been left with debts of about £300,000. He said the company's debts included payments to cover tax, VAT, PAYE, Surrey Police, Guildford Borough Council and private individuals.

Reasons cited by organisers included the abundance of competing major events in that year, most notably the London Olympics. Poor weather also contributed with the rain turning Stoke Park into a "quagmire by Saturday – and by Sunday it had turned into sticky bog".

To fill the gap, for 2013 the Magic FM Summer Of Love event was held at Stoke Park on the weekend of 13–14 July 2013, headlined by Jamiroquai and Bryan Adams.  A rival event, free festival GU1, took place the same weekend at the Holroyd Arms, a Guildford pub, in protest at what organisers saw as the "corporate takeover" of the former Guilfest by Magic FM's promoters Live Nation. The line-up included The Feathers, Louise Distras, Shakespearos, Anarchistwood, The Unbelievable Freeloaders From Mars, P45, Unexpected Item In The Bagging Area, Archive 45, Gobsausage, Black Anchor, Collage of Sound, Snork and Kerb..

Guilfest returned in 2014 after permission was given quite late for an event this size in January of the same year, with conditions imposed by the local council. Unfortunately despite reports of it being one of the best festivals the organisers had run, it went into insolvency again shortly afterwards blaming a bad weather forecast, leading to low ticket sales.

Revival
Eight years passed before Guilfest returned again, still being run by Tony Scott, scheduled for July 2022 at a new location, Hurtwood Polo Club, in Cranleigh.  This will be headlined by Peter Hook and Sister Sledge.

References

External links

 The GuilFest website
 UK Festival Award Winners 2006
 eFestivals GuilFest coverage

Music festivals in Surrey
Guildford
Folk festivals in the United Kingdom
1992 establishments in England
Music festivals established in 1992